Lung Mun is one of the 31 constituencies in the Tuen Mun District.

Created for the 1994 District Board elections, the constituency returns one district councillor to the Tuen Mun District Council, with an election every four years.

Lung Mun loosely covers areas surrounding Lung Mun Oasis, Lung Yat Estate, Tsing Shan Tsuen, Tuen Mun Kau Hui and Yeung Siu Hang in Tuen Mun with an estimated population of 17,075.

Councillors represented

Election results

2010s

References

Tuen Mun
Constituencies of Hong Kong
Constituencies of Tuen Mun District Council
1994 establishments in Hong Kong
Constituencies established in 1994